The Beauty of Horror is a horror-themed adult coloring book series created by Life of Agony bassist Alan Robert and published by IDW Publishing. and distributed by Penguin Random House. Volume one of the series was released in September 2016 and Nerdist called it "The World's Creepiest Adult Coloring Book". There are currently six books in the series with titles including The Beauty of Horror 2: Ghouliana's Creepatorium, The Beauty of Horror 3: Haunted Playgrounds, The Beauty of Horror 4: Creature Feature, The Beauty of Horror: Ghosts of Christmas, The Beauty of Horror: Tricks And Treats, and The Beauty of Horror: Haunt This Journal.

The Beauty of Horror 5: Haunt of Fame coloring book was announced on February 10, 2021. "It's like a twisted wax museum filled with all of my favorite pop culture stars," said Beauty of Horror creator Alan Robert. "Similar to how Ghouliana took on horror icons in the last book, this time she tackles rock royalty, sports heroes, and famous faces from TV and film. It's a bizarre mashup that's equally horrific as it is hilarious. I really can't wait to see what coloring fans do with these freaky designs!"

In 2018, a claymation video based on the Christmas edition went viral with over 7 million views.

A set of colorable tarot cards was featured on SyFy's Metal Crush program  and was published on June 15, 2021.

Rooster Teeth Studios announced in Variety that it had partnered with Eric Heisserer's production company Chronology and Beauty of Horror creator Alan Robert to develop an animated series based on the bestselling books.

References 

2016 books
2018 books
Coloring books